Kaare is a village in Lääne-Nigula Parish, Lääne County, in western Estonia.

Before the administrative reform in 2017, the village was in Martna Parish.

References

 

Villages in Lääne County